This is a list of years in South African television.

Twenty-first century

Twentieth century

See also 
 List of years in South Africa
 List of years in television

Television
Television in South Africa by year
South African television